Operation New York was a US Marine Corps operation that took place northwest and east of Phu Bai Combat Base, lasting from 26 February to 3 March 1966.

Prelude
On 26 February the 3rd Marine Division activated Task Unit Hotel, comprising Companies F and G of the 2nd Battalion 1st Marines and Company K of the 3rd Battalion 1st Marines at Phu Bai to support the Army of the Republic of Vietnam (ARVN) 1st Division which was engaged in 3 simultaneous operations. The Task Unit was assigned to sweep the Pho Lai village complex approximately 7 km northwest of Huế where a 100-strong Viet Cong unit was believed to be operating.

Operation

26 February
Companies F and G 2/1 Marines arrived by truck at the operation area in the late afternoon, while HMM-163 landed Company K northeast of the village to take up blocking positions. By 22:15 Companies F and G had swept the area and joined up with Company K without encountering any enemy and set up night positions.

27 February
Task Unit Hotel left Pho Lai and returned to Phu Bai by 18:15. Shortly after returning to base, the ARVN informed the Marines that their 1st Battalion, 3rd Regiment was heavily engaged with the Viet Cong 810th Battalion on the Phu Thu Peninsula east of the base. The Unit commander LCOL Hanifin ordered a night helicopter assault into positions north of the peninsula and by 02:00 on 28 February HMM-163 had landed all 3 companies.

28 February
Under the cover of artillery fire from the Phu Bai base, the 3 Marine Companies moved line abreast down the peninsula with the ARVN providing flank security. The Viet Cong quickly broke up into small groups and attempted to evade the Marines.

Aftermath
Operation New York concluded on 3 March, the Marines had suffered 17 dead and 37 wounded and claimed that the Vietcong suffered 120 killed and 7 captured.

Notes

Conflicts in 1966
1966 in Vietnam
Battles involving the United States
Battles involving Vietnam
February 1966 events
March 1966 events
Battles and operations of the Vietnam War in 1966
United States Marine Corps in the Vietnam War
History of Thừa Thiên Huế province